The Papua New Guinea Open is a golf tournament on the PGA Tour of Australasia. The event is held at Royal Port Moresby Golf Club, Port Moresby, Papua New Guinea. It has been a tour event since 2016. It is a Tier 2 event on the tour. Total prize money was A$140,000 in 2016, rising to $142,000 in 2017, $145,000 in 2018 and $150,000 in 2019. The 2019 winner was Peter Cooke who won by 2 strokes.

In 1978, Papua New Guinea joined the Asia-Pacific Golf Confederation with the intention of adding the Papua New Guinea Open to the Asia Golf Circuit, but attempts were ultimately aborted. That year, the PNG Open had a field of 144 competitors, including 40 professionals, 37 of whom were from Australia.

Winners

Prior to PGA Tour of Australasia sanctioning
This list is incomplete

2015 Josh Cabban
2014 Kalem Richardson
2013 Pieter Zwart
2012 Paul Spargo
2011 Matthew Ballard
2010 Leigh Deagan
2009 Michael Wright
2008 Joshua Carmichael
2007 Andrew Bonhomme
2006 Pat Giles
2005 Eddie Barr
2004 Troy Kennedy
2003 Dean Alaban
2002 Chris Downes
2001 David Grenfell
2000 Kyle Woodbine
1999 Eddie Barr
1998 Lucas Bimbo
1997 Anthony Musgrave
1996 Neal Kerry
1995 Dale Walsh
1994 Mark Officer
1979 Gerard Taylor
1978 Mike Ferguson
1977 Ted Ball

References

External links
Coverage on PGA Tour of Australasia's official site

PGA Tour of Australasia events
Golf tournaments in Papua New Guinea